St Benet Sherehog, additionally dedicated to St Osyth, was a medieval parish church built before the year 1111,  on a site now occupied by No 1 Poultry in Cordwainer Ward, in what was then the wool-dealing district of the City of London. A shere hog is a castrated ram after its first shearing.

History
The church was originally dedicated to St Osyth.  Sise Lane in the parish uses an abbreviated form of the saint's name. The historian John Stow believed that  the later dedication of "Benet Sherehog" was derived from a corruption of the name of Bennet Shorne, a benefactor of the church in the reign of  Edward II.

The patronage of the church belonged to the monastery of St Mary Overy until the Dissolution, when it passed to the Crown.

Matthew Griffith chaplain  to Charles I was rector from 1640 until 1642, when he was removed from the post and imprisoned after preaching a sermon entitled  "A Pathetical Persuasion to Pray for Publick Peace" in St Paul's Cathedral.

Destruction
St Benet's was one of the 86 parish churches destroyed in the Great Fire of London, and it was not selected to be rebuilt when the 1670 Act of Parliament became law. The parish was  united to that of  St Stephen Walbrook in the same year, but continued to be represented by its own churchwarden. In 1685, a church report judged the unification a success. Nearly two hundred years later, however, this arrangement was still capable of causing tension. Some of its parish records survive, and  have been collated.

The site of the church was used as a burial-ground for the united parishes until  closed by an Act of Parliament in 1853. It was excavated between 1994 and 1996, before the current office block was erected.

Burials
John Fresshe (d. 1397) alderman of Cordwainer Ward and Lord Mayor of London from 1394 to 1396.
Edward Hall (1497–1547), was an English lawyer, Member of Parliament, and historian.
Katherine (Fowler) Philips (1632-1664), was an English poet.
Hector Philips (1655-1655), was the infant son of Katherine Philips, about whose death two of her more famous poems were written.

References

Bibliography
 Bannerman,W.B, RAOC  Harleian Society 1919-20 The Registers of St, Stephen, Walbrook, and St. Benet Sherehog, London. Part I (Baptisms 1557 to 1790; Marriages 1557 to 1754; Burials 1557 to 1716) & Part II (Baptisms 1790 to 1860; Marriages 1754 to 1860; Burials 1716 to 1860) London, Harleian Society, 1920
 Betjeman, John, Sovereign City of London Churches, Andover: Pitkin, 1967 rpnt 1992 
 Cobb,G London City Churches: London, B T Batsford Ltd., 1977
 'Church of England, Parish of St. Stephen Walbrook: Visitation order issued by the Archdeacon of London to the united parishes, 1685'. - M0015630CL cited in City of London Parish Registers Guide 4 Hallows,A.(Ed) - London, Guildhall Library Research, 1974  .
 A Dictionary of London Harben,H: London, Herbert Jenkins, 1918
 Huelin, G, Vanished Churches of the City of London, London,Guildhall Library Publications,  1996ISBN 0900422424
 The London Encyclopaedia Hibbert,C; Weinreb,D; Keay,J: London, Pan Macmillan, 1983 (rev 1993,2008) 
 Miles, A., Tankard,D. White, W.  Burial at the site of the parish church of St Benet Sherehog before and after the Great Fire: excavations at 1 Poultry, City of London  London, Museum of London Archaeological Service, Monograph Series, 2007
Reynolds, H, The Churches of the City of London, London, The Bodley Head, 1922
 'Letter from Michael Gibbs, 33 Walbrook concerning the separateness of two church wardens’ duties'. The Times, Thursday, Sep 21, 1843; pg. 5; Issue 18407; col E

External links

 

12th-century church buildings in England
1666 disestablishments in England
Churches destroyed in the Great Fire of London and not rebuilt
Churches in the City of London
Former buildings and structures in the City of London